The OHBM Replication Award is an award presented annually by the Organization for Human Brain Mapping (OHBM). It is presented to a researcher in recognition of conducting and disseminating the results of a neuroimaging replication study of exceptional quality and impact.

Winners

History
The award was originally conceived by Chris Gorgolewski as an attempt to elevate the status of replication studies, which were often considered not as prestigious as other scientific activities. Researchers focusing too much on novel discoveries instead of scrutinizing previously published findings was big contribution to reproducibility crisis in psychology.

The award has increased the likelihood of members of the neuroimaging community to conduct and disseminate results of replication studies and the procedure of running the award has been made publicly available in hope other academic communities could implement similar awards.

See also

 List of neuroscience awards

References

Neuroimaging
Neuroscience awards